16 Biggest Hits is a 2005 Waylon Jennings compilation album. It is part of a series of similar 16 Biggest Hits albums released by Legacy Recordings. It has sold 747,000 copies in the US as of May 2013.

Track listing

Charts

Weekly charts

Year-end charts

References

Jennings, Waylon
Waylon Jennings compilation albums
2005 greatest hits albums